Marcelo Teles Negrão (born October 10, 1972 in São Paulo) is a volleyball player from Brazil, who was a member of the Brazil men's national volleyball team that won the gold medal at the 1992 Summer Olympics in Barcelona, Spain by defeating The Netherlands in the final. He currently plays beach volleyball.

Individual awards
 1992 FIVB World League "Best Spiker"
 Best Server: 1994 FIVB Volleyball Men's World Championship
 MVP : Olympics 1992

Clubs
 Banespa (1990)
 Telesp S. Paolo (1994)

External links
  
 

1972 births
Living people
Brazilian men's volleyball players
Volleyball players at the 1992 Summer Olympics
Volleyball players at the 1996 Summer Olympics
Olympic volleyball players of Brazil
Olympic gold medalists for Brazil
Sportspeople from São Paulo
Olympic medalists in volleyball
Medalists at the 1992 Summer Olympics
Pan American Games medalists in volleyball
Pan American Games silver medalists for Brazil
Medalists at the 1991 Pan American Games
Medalists at the 1999 Pan American Games